The John Allan Cameron Show was a Canadian television variety series produced by CBC Television in Halifax from 1979 to 1980, with repeat episodes airing until 1982.

This was the second national television series featuring host John Allan Cameron (1938–2006). His previous series, John Allan Cameron, was broadcast on private network CTV in 1975 and 1976.

Regular and guest participants
Many of the guests in the series' first season were athletes such as Trevor Berbick, Don Fontana, Tony Gabriel, Nancy Garapick, Brian Heaney, Eddie Shack, Errol Thompson and Debbie Van Kiekebelt.

The second season's non-musical content featured Hollywood-themed segments where Cameron would portray legendary entertainment stars and movie characters. Series regulars Hughie and Allen presented a comic newscast entitled "News From Home".

Musical performances featuring Cameron and his band were staged in Seaton Auditorium at Halifax's Mount Saint Vincent University. Series guests included Bruce Cockburn, Denny Doherty, The Good Brothers, Steve Goodman, Murray McLauchlan, Will Millar (The Irish Rovers), Tom Paxton, Ronnie Prophet, Tom Rush, Sonny Terry with Brownie McGhee, Ian Tyson, Valdy, Roger Whittaker and Mason Williams. Skip Beckwith was the series musical director, who also played bass for Cameron's band, "The Cape Breton Symphony".

Scheduling
The first season in 1979 was a summer series which aired on Fridays at 9 p.m. Eastern time. 1980's second season began in October 1980, running on Wednesdays at 7:30 p.m. until December of that year.

CBC aired brief repeat runs of the series in 1981 and 1982 on Monday evenings at 7:30 p.m.

References

External links

 CBC Archives: Morningside: Remembering Canada's 'godfather' of Celtic music

 Queen's University Directory of CBC Television Series (The John Allan Cameron Show archived listing link via archive.org)

1979 Canadian television series debuts
1981 Canadian television series endings
CBC Television original programming
1970s Canadian music television series
Television shows filmed in Halifax, Nova Scotia
1980s Canadian music television series